Paella is a rice dish originally from Valencia. While non-Spaniards commonly view it as Spain's national dish, Spaniards almost unanimously consider it to be a dish from the Valencian region. Valencians, in turn, regard paella as one of their identifying symbols. It is one of the best-known dishes in Spanish cuisine.

The dish takes its name from the wide, shallow traditional pan used to cook the dish on an open fire, paella being the word for a frying pan in Valencian/Catalan language. As a dish, it may have ancient roots, but in its modern form, it is traced back to the mid-19th century, in the rural area around the Albufera lagoon adjacent to the city of Valencia, on the Mediterranean coast of Spain.

Paella valenciana is the traditional paella of the Valencia region, believed to be the original recipe, and consists of round-grain rice, bajoqueta and tavella (varieties of green beans), rabbit, chicken, sometimes duck, and garrofó (a variety of lima or butter bean), cooked in olive oil and chicken broth. The dish is sometimes seasoned with whole rosemary branches. Traditionally, the yellow color comes from saffron, but turmeric and calendula can be used as substitutes. Artichoke hearts and stems may be used as seasonal ingredients. Most paella cooks use bomba rice, but Valencians tend to use a cultivar known as senia.

Paella de marisco (seafood paella) replaces meat with seafood and omits beans and green vegetables, while paella mixta (mixed paella) combines meat from livestock, seafood, vegetables, and sometimes beans, with the traditional rice.

Other popular local variations of paella are cooked throughout the Mediterranean area, the rest of Spain, and internationally.

History

Possible origins 

Moors in Muslim Spain began rice cultivation around the 10th century. Consequently, eastern Iberian Peninsula locals often made casseroles of rice, fish, and spices for family gatherings and religious feasts, thus establishing the custom of eating rice in Spain. This led to rice becoming a staple by the 15th century. Afterward, it became customary for cooks to combine rice with vegetables, beans, and dry cod, providing an acceptable meal for Lent. Along Spain's Mediterranean coast, rice was predominantly eaten with fish.

Spanish food historian Lourdes March notes that the dish "symbolizes the union and heritage of two important cultures, the Roman, which gives us the utensil and the Arab which brought us the basic food of humanity for centuries: rice."

Naming, etymology and paellera

Paella is a Valencian word that means frying pan, from which the dish gets its name. Valencian speakers use the word paella for all pans, including the traditional shallow pan used for cooking the homonym dish. The pan is made of polished or coated steel with two side handles.

In many regions of Spain and other Spanish-speaking countries, the term paellera may be used for the traditional pan, while paella is reserved for the rice dish prepared in it. Both paella and paellera are correct terms for the pan.

According to the etymologist Joan Coromines, the Catalan word paella derives from the Old French word paelle for frying pan, which in turn comes from the Latin word patella for pan; he thinks that otherwise the word should be padella, as inter-vowel -d- dropping is not typical of Old Catalan.

The word paella is also related to paila used in many Latin American countries. Paila in Latin American Spanish refers to a variety of cookware resembling metal and clay pans, which are also used for both cooking and serving.

The Latin root patella from which paella derives is also akin to the modern French poêle, the Italian padella, and the Old Spanish padilla.

Some claim that the word paella comes from the Arabic , pronounced baqaayya, meaning "leftovers." This claim is based on the 8th-century custom in which Moorish kings' servants would take home the rice, chicken, and vegetables their employers left at the end of the meal. It has been said, however, that a problem with this etymology is that the word paella is not attested until six centuries after Moorish Valencia was conquered by James I.

Paella valenciana
Originally, paella made in Valencia was a lunchtime meal for farmers and farm laborers. Workers would gather what was available to them around the rice fields. This often included tomatoes, onions, and snails. Rabbit or duck was a common addition, or chicken less often.

On special occasions, 18th century Valencians used calderos to cook the rice in the open air of their orchards near lake Albufera. Water vole meat was one of the main ingredients of early paellas, along with eel and butter beans. Novelist Vicente Blasco Ibáñez described the Valencia custom of eating water voles in Cañas y Barro (1902), a realistic novel about life among the fishermen and peasants near lake Albufera.

Living standards rose with the sociological changes of the late 19th century in Spain, giving rise to gatherings and outings in the countryside. This led to a change in paella's ingredients, as well, using instead rabbit, chicken, duck, and sometimes snails. This dish became so popular that in 1840, a local Spanish newspaper first used the word paella to refer to the recipe rather than the pan.

The most widely used, complete ingredient list of this era was: short-grain white rice, chicken, rabbit, snails (optional), duck (optional), butter beans, great northern beans, runner beans, artichoke (a substitute for runner beans in the winter), tomatoes, fresh rosemary, sweet paprika, saffron, garlic (optional), salt, olive oil, and water. Poorer Valencians sometimes used only snails for meat. Many Valencians insist that no more than these ingredients should go into making modern paella valenciana, and, in particular, that fish and shellfish are "absolutely out of the question." Another important rule, according to Valencians, is that fresh rosemary should not be added to paella valenciana made with rosemary-eating snails.

Seafood and mixed paella
On the Mediterranean coast, Valencian fishermen used seafood instead of meat and beans to make paella. In this recipe, the seafood is served in the shell. Later, Spaniards living outside of Valencia combined seafood with meat from land animals, and mixed paella was born. This paella is sometimes called preparación barroca (baroque preparation) due to the variety of ingredients and its final presentation.

During the 20th century, paella's popularity spread past Spain's borders. As other cultures set out to make paella, the dish invariably acquired regional influences. Consequently, paella recipes went from being relatively simple to including a wide variety of seafood, meat, sausage (including chorizo), vegetables and many different seasonings. However, the most globally popular recipe is seafood paella.

Throughout non-Valencia Spain, mixed paella is relatively easy to find. Some restaurants in Spain and abroad that serve this mixed version refer to it as Paella valenciana. However, Valencians insist that only the original two Valencia recipes are authentic and view all others as inferior, not genuine, or even grotesque.

Other Valencian recipes that have similar preparations are arròs a banda and arròs del senyoret.

Basic cooking methods 

According to tradition in Valencia, paella is cooked over an open fire, fueled by orange and pine branches and pine cones. This produces an aromatic smoke which infuses the paella. Also, dining guests traditionally eat directly out of the pan instead of serving in plates.

Some recipes call for paella to be covered and left to settle for five to ten minutes after cooking.

After cooking paella, a layer of roasted rice may be at the bottom of the pan, called socarrat in Valencià. The layer develops on its own if the paella is cooked over a burner or open fire. This is traditionally considered positive (as long as it is not scorched), and Valencia natives enjoy eating it.

Paella valenciana

This recipe is standardized because Valencia originals consider it traditional and very much part of their culture. Rice in paella valenciana is never braised in oil, as pilaf, though the paella made further southwest of Valencia often is.

Heat oil in a paella.
Sauté meat after seasoning with salt.
Add green vegetables and sauté until soft.
Add garlic (optional), grated tomatoes, beans, and sauté.
Add paprika and sauté.
Add water, saffron (or food coloring), snails (optional), and rosemary.
Boil to make broth and allow it to reduce by half.
Remove the rosemary once the flavour has been infused or it starts to fall apart.
Add rice and simmer until rice is cooked.

Some people enjoy garnishing their served plate with freshly squeezed lemon.

Paella de marisco (Seafood paella) 

Recipes for this dish vary somewhat, even in Valencia. The recipe below is based on the two sources cited here.
Make a seafood broth from shrimp heads, onions, garlic, and bay leaves.
Heat oil in a paella.
Add mussels. Cook until they open, and then remove.
Sauté Norway lobster and whole, deep-water rose shrimp. Then remove both the lobster and shrimp.
Add chopped cuttlefish and sauté.
Add shrimp tails and sauté.
Add garlic and sauté.
Add grated tomato and sauté.
Add rice and braise in sofrito.
Add paprika and sauté.
Add seafood broth and then saffron (or food coloring).
Add salt to taste.
Add the deep-water rose shrimp, mussels, and Norway lobster that were set aside.
Simmer until rice is cooked.

Paella mixta (Mixed paella)  

There are countless mixed paella recipes. The following method is common to most of these. Seasoning depends greatly on individual preferences and regional influences. However, salt, saffron, and garlic are almost always included.
Make a broth from seafood, chicken, onions, garlic, bell peppers, and bay leaf.
Heat oil in a paella.
Sear red bell pepper strips and set aside.
Sear crustaceans and set aside.
Season meat lightly with salt and sauté meat until golden brown.
Add onions, garlic, and bell peppers. Sauté until vegetables are tender.
Add grated tomatoes and sauté.
Add dry seasonings except for salt.
Add rice.
Braise rice until covered with sofrito.
Add broth.
Add salt to taste.
Add saffron (or food coloring) and mix well.
Simmer until rice is almost cooked.
Replace crustaceans.
Continue simmering until rice and crustaceans are finished cooking.
Garnish with seared red bell pepper strips.

Variants

Philippines 

Arroz a la valenciana (Spanish) or Arroz à valenciana (Portuguese) is considered as a part of Philippine cuisine. It is considered as the Philippine version of paella.

The Philippine version uses glutinous rice; otherwise, the ingredients are the same. In the Philippines, arroz a la valenciana refers to chicken, and longganisa (chorizo) versions.

In popular culture

Competitions and records 

It has become a custom at mass gatherings in the Valencia region (festivals, political campaigns, protests, etc.) to prepare enormous paellas, sometimes to win a place in the Guinness World Records book. Chefs use gargantuan paelleras for these events.

Valencia restaurateur Juan Galbis claims to have made the world's largest paella with help from a team of workers on 2 October 2001. This paella fed about 110,000 people, according to Galbis' former website. Galbis says this paella was even larger than his earlier world-record paella made on 8 March 1992, which fed about 100,000 people. Galbis' record-breaking 1992 paella is listed in Guinness World Records.

Controversial representations 
Some non-Spanish chefs include chorizo in their paellas and other ingredients, which Valencia people believe do not belong in paella of any type. Famous cases are Jamie Oliver's paella recipe (which included chorizo) and Gordon Ramsay's. The author Josep Pla once noted:

However, in an article for El País, Spanish food writer Ana Vega 'Biscayenne', citing historical references, showed that traditional Valencian paella did indeed include chorizo, exclaiming, "Ah Jamie, we'll have to invite you to the Falles."

Emoji
In 2015, an emoji for paella was proposed to Unicode. Although it is generally rendered as paella, Samsung has rendered the symbol as a Korean hot pot.

Related dishes 

Traditional Valencian cuisine offers recipes similar to paella valenciana and paella de marisco such as arròs negre, arròs al forn, arròs a banda and arròs amb fesols i naps since rice is the base of much of the local cuisine.

Fideuà is a Valencian pasta noodle dish variation cooked similarly in a paella. It may be served with allioli sauce.

Other related dishes:

Arroz del Senyoret – A seafood paella typical from Valencia in which the seafood comes all peeled, so it is easier to eat. It translates as "little lord"
Arroz a la valenciana – Latin American and Filipino adaptation of the Valencian style of cooking rice, uses annatto instead of saffron
Arroz con gandules – Latin American (Caribbean) adaptation
Arroz con pollo – Latin American adaptation with chicken
Bringhe – pre-colonial Filipino dish derived from biryani dishes but merged with paella during the colonial period. Uses glutinous rice, turmeric, and uniquely, coconut milk.
Jambalaya – Louisiana dish influenced by paella and the French  from Provence
Locrio – Dominican descendant of paella.
Paelya – Filipino adaptation of paella that distinctively use glutinous rice, also uses annatto, turmeric, or safflower. Also spelled "paella", but pronounced without .

See also 

 Arroz a la valenciana
 Biryani
 Jambalaya
 List of rice dishes
 Mediterranean cuisine
 Paelya
 Pilaf
 Risotto
 Spanish rice
 Valencian cuisine

References

Further reading 

 

Valencian cuisine
Spanish cuisine
Spanish rice dishes
National dishes
Seafood and rice dishes
Rabbit dishes